Lonesome Dove Church is a 2014 Canadian Western film directed by Terry Miles and starring Tom Berenger and Greyston Holt.

Cast
 Tom Berenger as John Shepherd
 Greyston Holt as Isaac Shepherd
 Alex Zahara as Butch Henley
 Nicole Oliver as Nancy Shepherd
 Geoff Gustafson as Dutch
 Serge Houde as Charles Stone
 George Canyon as Gorgeous George
 Philip Granger as Pastor Simmons
 Bruce Blain as Hillbilly
 Mike Garthwaite as Jose Sanchez

References

External links
 
 

2014 films
2014 Western (genre) films
Canadian Western (genre) films
English-language Canadian films
Lionsgate films
2010s English-language films
2010s Canadian films